A nabob  is a conspicuously wealthy man deriving his fortune in the east, especially in India during the 18th century with the privately held East India Company.

Etymology
Nabob is an Anglo-Indian term that came to English from Urdu, possibly from Hindustani nawāb/navāb, borrowed into English during British colonial rule in India. It is possible this was via the intermediate  Portuguese nababo, the Portuguese having preceded the British in India.

The word entered colloquial usage in England from 1612. Native Europeans used nabob to refer to those who returned from India after having made a fortune there.

In late 19th century San Francisco, rapid urbanization led to an exclusive enclave of the rich and famous on the west coast who built large mansions in the Nob Hill neighborhood. This included prominent tycoons such as Leland Stanford, founder of Stanford University and other members of The Big Four who were known as nabobs, which was shortened to nob, giving the area its eventual name.

The term was used by William Safire in a speech written for United States Vice President Spiro Agnew in 1970, which received heavy media coverage. Agnew, increasingly identified with his attacks on critics of the Nixon administration, described these opponents as "nattering nabobs of negativism".

History
The English use of nabob was for a person who became rapidly wealthy in a foreign country, typically India, and returned home with considerable power and influence. In England, the name was applied to men who made fortunes working for the East India Company and, on their return home, used the wealth to purchase seats in Parliament.

A common fear was that these individuals – the nabobs, their agents, and those who took their bribes – would use their wealth and influence to corrupt Parliament. The collapse of the Company's finances in 1772 due to bad administration, both in India and Britain, aroused public indignation towards the Company's activities and the behaviour of the Company's employees. Samuel Foote gave a satirical look at those men who had enriched themselves through the East India Company in his 1772 play, The Nabob.

This perception of the pernicious influence wielded by nabobs in both social and political life led to increased scrutiny of the East India Company. A number of prominent Company men underwent inquiries and impeachments on charges of corruption and misrule in India. Warren Hastings, first Governor-General of India, was impeached in 1788 and acquitted in 1795 after a seven-year-long trial. Robert Clive, 1st Baron Clive, MP for Shrewsbury, was forced to defend himself against charges brought against him in the House of Commons. Pitt's India Act of 1784 gave the British government effective control of the private company for the first time. The new policies were designed for an elite civil service career that minimized temptations for corruption.

See also
 Nobby

References

External links

 India and the British – The East India Company – Nabobs
 The First Asians in Britain
 {Cite EB1911|wstitle=Nabob|short=x}

Class-related slurs
Political metaphors referring to people